The Magong Harbor is a harbor in Magong City, Penghu, Taiwan.

History
In 2015, Taiwan International Ports Corporation invested NT$1.1 billion to create the Penghu Pier to accommodate cruise liners, to make Magong Harbor a world class cruise terminal. The pier was expected to be launched in early 2018.

Architecture
The harbor has 9 docks with total length of 956 meters.

Destinations
The harbor serves boat trips to Kaohsiung, Tainan and Chiayi.

See also
 Transportation in Taiwan

References

Ports and harbors of Penghu County